This is a list of Swedish football transfers for the 2022 summer transfer window. Only transfers featuring Allsvenskan are listed.

Allsvenskan

Note: Flags indicate national team as has been defined under FIFA eligibility rules. Players may hold more than one non-FIFA nationality.

AIK

In:

Out:

Degerfors

In:

Out:

Djurgården

In:

Out:

Elfsborg

In:

Out:

GIF Sundsvall

In:

Out:

Häcken

In:

Out:

Hammarby

In:

Out:

Helsingborg

In:

Out:

IFK Göteborg

In:

Out:

Kalmar

In:

Out:

Malmö

In:

Out:

Mjällby

In:

Out:

Norrköping

In:

Out:

Sirius

In:

Out:

Varberg

In:

Out:

Värnamo

In:

Out:

See also
 2022 Allsvenskan

References

External links
 Official site of the SvFF
 Official site of the Allsvenskan

Football transfers summer 2022
Transfers
2022